Sweat It Out is an Australian Dance Music record label founded by Adrian Thomas (aka Ajax) in 2008.

In February 2021, the label announced the launch of its publishing arm, bringing on a handful of songwriters as its first signees.

Artists
 Ajax
 Anna Lunoe
 Anna Bass
 A-Trak
 Crooked Colours
 Dena Amy
 Dillon Francis
 Diplo
 Dom Dolla
 Enschway
 Free Nations
 Go Freek
 Indian Summer
 Luude
 Matilda Pearl
 Mazy
 Moli
 Motez
 Nicky Night Time
 PoloShirt
 Pricie
 Purple Disco Machine
 Rüfüs Du Sol
 Slumberjack
 Torren Foot
 What So Not
 Winston Surfshirt
 Yolanda Be Cool

See also
 List of record labels

References

Record labels based in Sydney
Record labels established in 2008